Waihi is a town in Hauraki District in the North Island of New Zealand, especially notable for its history as a gold mine town.

The town is at the foot of the Coromandel Peninsula, close to the western end of the Bay of Plenty. The nearby resort town of Waihi Beach, ten kilometres to the east, is often regarded as the westernmost point of the Bay of Plenty region. To the west are the hills of the Kaimai Ranges. Road access from this direction is through the winding Karangahake Gorge road. Waihi has a warm and temperate climate but unusually high rainfall for New Zealand's east coast with an average annual rainfall of 2147 mm.

Demographics

Waihi had a population of 5,403 at the 2018 New Zealand census, an increase of 741 people (15.9%) since the 2013 census, and an increase of 783 people (16.9%) since the 2006 census. There were 2,223 households, comprising 2,604 males and 2,790 females, giving a sex ratio of 0.93 males per female, with 930 people (17.2%) aged under 15 years, 729 (13.5%) aged 15 to 29, 2,196 (40.6%) aged 30 to 64, and 1,542 (28.5%) aged 65 or older.

Ethnicities were 82.7% European/Pākehā, 23.0% Māori, 3.7% Pacific peoples, 4.6% Asian, and 1.4% other ethnicities. People may identify with more than one ethnicity.

The percentage of people born overseas was 15.8, compared with 27.1% nationally.

Although some people chose not to answer the census's question about religious affiliation, 53.6% had no religion, 31.8% were Christian, 1.7% had Māori religious beliefs, 0.7% were Hindu, 0.2% were Muslim, 0.6% were Buddhist and 2.8% had other religions.

Of those at least 15 years old, 402 (9.0%) people had a bachelor's or higher degree, and 1,320 (29.5%) people had no formal qualifications. 297 people (6.6%) earned over $70,000 compared to 17.2% nationally. The employment status of those at least 15 was that 1,455 (32.5%) people were employed full-time, 690 (15.4%) were part-time, and 225 (5.0%) were unemployed.

Rural surrounds

Waihi Rural had a population of 2,148 at the 2018 New Zealand census, an increase of 336 people (18.5%) since the 2013 census, and an increase of 366 people (20.5%) since the 2006 census. There were 834 households, comprising 1,074 males and 1,077 females, giving a sex ratio of 1.0 males per female. The median age was 47.4 years (compared with 37.4 years nationally), with 408 people (19.0%) aged under 15 years, 282 (13.1%) aged 15 to 29, 1,035 (48.2%) aged 30 to 64, and 426 (19.8%) aged 65 or older.

Ethnicities were 91.8% European/Pākehā, 15.9% Māori, 1.8% Pacific peoples, 2.0% Asian, and 2.0% other ethnicities. People may identify with more than one ethnicity.

The percentage of people born overseas was 15.1, compared with 27.1% nationally.

Although some people chose not to answer the census's question about religious affiliation, 58.0% had no religion, 31.8% were Christian, 0.1% had Māori religious beliefs, 0.4% were Hindu, 0.4% were Buddhist and 1.3% had other religions.

Of those at least 15 years old, 225 (12.9%) people had a bachelor's or higher degree, and 390 (22.4%) people had no formal qualifications. The median income was $28,800, compared with $31,800 nationally. 246 people (14.1%) earned over $70,000 compared to 17.2% nationally. The employment status of those at least 15 was that 789 (45.3%) people were employed full-time, 342 (19.7%) were part-time, and 66 (3.8%) were unemployed.

History and culture

Mining township

Waihi is located in the Coromandel district, which was one of the great gold mining districts of the world. The township grew around the mining operations since the discovery of gold in 1878 by prospectors John McCombie and Robert Lee. The samples of rock they had sent to be assayed were not considered worthwhile, so they left the area.

Their claim was taken over by William Nicholl in 1879. He marked out , calling his claim 'Martha' after a family member. Several smaller claims were later merged to form the Martha Company. By 1882 the first battery to break gold-bearing rock was in operation. The Martha Mine eventually grew into one of the world's most important gold and silver mines, after industrial cyanide processes made recovering gold from the low-grade ores easier. Waihi prospered with the mine, by 1908 being the fastest-growing town in the Auckland Province, three times the size of Hamilton.

Waihi was also a major centre of union unrest in New Zealand during the early years of the 20th century. The 1912 miners' strike led to violence, including the death of unionist Fred Evans in an incident which still causes some resentment in the town.

By 1952, when the mighty Martha Mine closed, around 5.6 million ounces (174,160 kg) of gold and 38.4 million ounces (1,193,180 kg) of silver had been produced from 11,932,000 tonnes of ore. Mining stopped in 1952 after a total of 160 km of tunnels had been driven into the quartz of Martha Hill, not because the Martha had run out of gold, but rather because of fixed gold prices, lack of manpower, and increasing costs. Mining in the Coromandel Peninsula had otherwise ceased by the 1980s.

However, mining later resumed, with some protests against it during the 1987 consent process. Plans to stop operations in the 2000s were eventually shelved as well, and the mines new owner OceaniaGold is actively investing in extending the further economic life of the mine and the underground operations. As of 2009, the mine constituted 25-30% of the local economy.

The Golden Cross mine was a gold and silver mine in the neighbouring Waitekauri Valley. It first operated as an underground gold mine from 1895 to 1920. Gold and silver was mined by underground and open pit methods from 1991 to 1998.

Railways 

In November 1905, a branch line railway was opened to Waihi from Paeroa; this eventually evolved into the East Coast Main Trunk Railway, which reached Taneatua in 1928. By the 1960s, traffic volumes for the port of Tauranga had outgrown the capacity of the circuitous line through Waihi and a deviation to the south was built, including the Kaimai Tunnel. It opened in 1978, making the line through Waihi redundant, but the Goldfields Railway was established to save the six kilometres of railway between Waihi and Waikino. The railway continues to operate today as Goldfields Railway and is a popular tourist attraction.

Counterculture era

In the 1970s Waihi saw a large influx of hippies in search of environmentally friendly alternative lifestyles settle there and around the Waikino area. These young counterculture proponents brought with them numerous cottage industries which helped supplement Waihi's economy. The Nambassa rock and alternative festivals were held around Waihi and Waikino between 1975 and 1982, increasing the population by around 10,000-75,000 for a few days each year and bringing revenue to the town. Temporary tent cities were established on the Northern end of Waihi on farms up Landlyst Rd at Golden Valley, to accommodate festival goers.

Recent history 
In the late 1980s a new open pit started operations over the top of the old underground mine. This operation is nearing its completion, however recent plans to cutback the pit wall and recent underground mining have postponed the promised lake and recreational area. A new underground mine called Favona is in operation near the processing plant to the east of Waihi. The mining company have stated that it is impossible to create the lake while underground operations are occurring near the site because the low-level water table connects with the underground mine which has to be de-watered.

In the late 1990s several properties had to be condemned and roads such as Brickfield Road, Pipe Lane, Junction Road and parts of Bulltown Road, Hobson Street, Grey Street, Slevin Street, Newman Street, Barry Road, and main road Seddon Avenue permanently closed after the land under them subsided as a result of the collapse of old underground mine workings, with visible holes and cracks on the surface.  In December 2001, a home adjacent to Martha Pit collapsed into historical workings, 14 neighbouring homes were affected, some never able to return to get personal belongings.  Another 31 homes were also bought once more areas were identified  to be at high, medium or low risk of collapse into historical workings adjacent to the pit.  Today the mine's smoko room sits near this site. Noise, dust, blasting vibrations continue to cause stress for some residents as operations in the pit continue. The iconic Pumphouse has  been moved to ensure its safety which also allows for the mine pit to be widened and more gold retrieved from the site the pumphouse was originally housed.

Mine management has received positive responses for its rigorous environmental effects control procedures and its commitment to the local community in terms of consultation and financial assistance. This has, amongst other things, led to the mine management company, Newmont Waihi Gold, receiving the 'Advanced Sustainable Business Award' from Environment Waikato, the Regional Council of the area.  Despite all these attempts some of the mine's neighbours do not qualify for compensation for the mine's impact.

Mining remains the major employer in the area thanks to the company postponing the long promised mine closure and lake formation in 2007.  OceanaGold will   stay until 2017 when consents expire, unless they find more resources when they will apply to stay. 
Until the electrical appliance industry was deregulated in New Zealand in the 1980s, Waihi had a television assembly plant operated first by Akrad then by Philips which employed 400 locally and 1500 nationwide.

Marae

Waihi has one marae, Waihi Community Marae.

Waihi Marae, with Tapeka meeting house, is near Tokaanu, and not affiliated nor even close, being down by Turangi, near Taupo..and is Tuwharetoa.

Waihi Town is part of Pare Hauraki area.

Current mining 

OceanaGold currently operates the Favona, Trio and Correnso underground gold and silver mines under the eastern end of the Waihi township. The Correnso underground mine is the current active operation and is producing approximately 100,000 ounces of gold each year.

The Martha open pit is not currently active due to a slip on the north wall in April 2016, but continues to draw large tourist numbers visiting the pit and nearby Pumphouse at the top of Waihi's main street.

Education 

The college was established as a District High School in 1932 and became a Forms 3–7 College in 1954. It moved to its current site in 1959. In 1976 it extended its roll to cover forms 1 and 2. Forms 1-7 are now known as years 7–13.

All these schools are coeducational. The roll numbers are as of

Renumbering project 
In March 2016 a renumbering project was put into place by Hauraki District Council halving Waihi streets such as Union Street, Rosemont Road, Seddon Avenue and Toomey Street in order to meet demands by the NZ Post office making it easier to find addresses. New street names include Amaranth Street, Montrose Road and Park Lane. Parry Palm Avenue which begins at the entrance from Paeroa now expands to the Martin Road and Baber Street intersection while Kenny Street becomes Waihi's longest road beginning at the infamous 'Rocket Park' (Victoria Park) expanding to the Waihi/Whangamata road. The renumbering project affected 143 Waihi properties and 650 Waihi residents. Montrose Road was originally going to be named Nicholl Street in honour of William Nicholl who developed the Martha Mine, but was at fault due to a last minute change.

Cornish Pumphouse 
The "Cornish Pumphouse" was originally built in a different location next to the Martha Mine in 1904 to accommodate a large Cornish steam engine designed to pump water out of the mine. The building's design originated from one used in tin mines in Cornwall, England.

The horizontal Cornish pump was used up to 1913 to raise water from a depth of around 400 metres (1,300 ft) via the adjacent No 5 shaft at a rate of over 400,000 litres per hour. After 1913, electric pumps were used to dewater the mine, but the pumphose was kept in working order until 1929 as a backup.

From the 1930s onwards, the building had been stripped of all machinery and left in an increasingly derelict state. In 1983, the building was registered as a Historic Place Category 1 with Heritage New Zealand due to its historical importance as one of the country's principal industrial monuments.

In 2001, the area surrounding the pumphouse was fenced off, following subsidence in nearby Barry Road. Investigations reached the conclusion that the only way to protect the building was to relocate it to a safer site. The operation to move the Cornish Pumphouse to a site 300 metres (980 ft) away was started in 2006 with the installation of internal steel bracing and the building of a relocation causeway.

Later in the year, the building, weighing 1,840 tonnes, was moved over the course of three months along teflon-coated concrete beams to its present location, which is easily accessible via a footpath from Seddon Street.

Some internal steel bracing remains installed in the building and it is able to be viewed by the public during daylight hours.

References

External links

Waihi promotional website
The Waihi Museum

Populated places in Waikato
Hauraki District
Mining communities in New Zealand
Coromandel Peninsula